Heterotis is the scientific name of two genera of organisms and may refer to:

Heterotis (fish), a genus of fishes in the family Osteoglossidae
Heterotis (plant), a genus of plants in the family Melastomataceae